Hauker Gunnarsson is a paralympic athlete from Iceland competing mainly in category T36 sprint events.

Hauker competed in four Paralympic games winning a total of six medals.  His first games were in 1984 Summer Paralympics where he competed in the long jump, shot put, 100m and won bronze medals in both the 200m and 400m.  Four years later in Seoul at the 1988 Summer Paralympics he won bronze again in the 200m and 400m and improved to win gold in the 100m.  At the Barcelona games in 1992 he failed to win medals in the 100m or 400m but won a bronze in the 200m.  His final games were in 1996 where he competed in the 100m, 200m and long jump but was unable to win any further medals.

References

Haukur Gunnarsson
Athletes (track and field) at the 1984 Summer Paralympics
Athletes (track and field) at the 1988 Summer Paralympics
Athletes (track and field) at the 1992 Summer Paralympics
Athletes (track and field) at the 1996 Summer Paralympics
Haukur Gunnarsson
Haukur Gunnarsson
Living people
Medalists at the 1984 Summer Paralympics
Medalists at the 1988 Summer Paralympics
Medalists at the 1992 Summer Paralympics
Year of birth missing (living people)
Paralympic medalists in athletics (track and field)
Icelandic male sprinters